North Hero State Park is a 399-acre day use state park on Lake Champlain in North Hero, Vermont. It is a stop on the Lake Champlain Paddlers' Trail.

Activities includes swimming, boating, fishing, hiking, picnicking, bicycling, wildlife watching, and winter sports.

There is a flush toilet at the beach area, a concrete boat ramp, and picnic area.

The park used to host camping, but that has been discontinued.

References

State parks of Vermont
Protected areas of Grand Isle County, Vermont
North Hero, Vermont
1963 establishments in Vermont
Protected areas established in 1963